McGeachy is a surname. Notable people with the surname include:

Edward McGeachy, the Crown Surveyor for the county of Surrey in Jamaica
Forster Alleyne McGeachy (1809–1887), British politician
Iain David McGeachy, British singer-songwriter and guitarist
Neill McGeachy (1942–2018), American basketball coach